Brooklet may refer to the following places:

 Brooklet, New South Wales, Australia
 Brooklet, Georgia, United States